("I Vote No") is an advocacy group in Italy that successfully campaigned to reject the constitutional reform, proposed by Matteo Renzi's government and approved by the Italian Parliament in the Spring of 2016, in the December 2016 constitutional referendum. The group's honorary president is Gustavo Zagrebelsky.

On 30 October 2015 the "Committee for No to the referendum on the modification of the Constitution" (Comitato per il No al referendum sulle modifiche alla Costituzione) was founded, with Alessandro Pace as president and Gustavo Zagrebelsky as honorary president. Other notable members are Antonio Di Pietro, Maurizio Landini, Stefano Rodotà and Cesare Salvi.

On 11 March 2016, on the newspaper Il Fatto Quotidiano many notable professors, intellectuals, politicians and artists have signed a manifesto in opposition of the reforms. The most famous signatories were: 
 
 Nicola Acocella
 Andrea Bajani
 Luciano Canfora
 Luigi Ciotti
 Paul Ginsborg
 Monica Guerritore
 Leo Gullotta
 Paolo Leon
 Valerio Magrelli
 Fiorella Mannoia
 Ivano Marescotti
 Citto Maselli
 Giuliano Montaldo
 Piergiorgio Odifreddi
 Moni Ovadia
 Giorgio Parisi
 Gianfranco Pasquino
 Daniela Poggi
 Giacomo Scarpelli
 Giuseppe Sergi
 Toni Servillo
 Marco Travaglio
 Gianni Vattimo
 Daniele Vicari 
 Alex Zanotelli

References 

2016 establishments in Italy
2016 elections in Italy